Dole pri Litiji is a village in the Municipality of Litija in central Slovenia. The area is part of the traditional region of Lower Carniola. It is now included with the rest of the municipality in the Central Sava Statistical Region; until January 2014 the municipality was part of the Central Slovenia Statistical Region.

The local parish church is dedicated to the Assumption of Mary and belongs to the Roman Catholic Diocese of Novo Mesto. It was built in 1858.

References

External links

Dole pri Litiji on Geopedia

Populated places in the Municipality of Litija